In mathematics, quadrature is a historical term which means the process of determining area. This term is still used nowadays in the context of differential equations, where "solving an equation by quadrature" or "reduction to quadrature" means expressing its solution in terms of integrals.

Quadrature problems served as one of the main sources of problems in the development of calculus, and introduce important topics in mathematical analysis.

History

Antiquity 

Greek mathematicians understood the determination of an area of a figure as the process of geometrically constructing a square having the same area (squaring), thus the name quadrature for this process. The Greek geometers were not always successful (see squaring the circle), but they did carry out quadratures of some figures whose sides were not simply line segments, such as the lune of Hippocrates and the parabola. By a certain Greek tradition, these constructions had to be performed using only a compass and straightedge, though not all Greek mathematicians adhered to this dictum.
For a quadrature of a rectangle with the sides a and b it is necessary to construct a square with the side  (the geometric mean of a and b). For this purpose it is possible to use the following: if one draws the circle with diameter made from joining line segments of lengths a and b, then the height (BH in the diagram) of the line segment drawn perpendicular to the diameter, from the point of their connection to the point where it crosses the circle, equals the geometric mean of a and b. A similar geometrical construction solves the problems of quadrature of a parallelogram and of a triangle.

Problems of quadrature for curvilinear figures are much more difficult. The quadrature of the circle with compass and straightedge was proved in the 19th century to be impossible. Nevertheless, for some figures a quadrature can be performed. The quadratures of the surface of a sphere and a parabola segment discovered by Archimedes became the highest achievement of analysis in antiquity.
 The area of the surface of a sphere is equal to four times the area of the circle formed by a great circle of this sphere.
 The area of a segment of a parabola determined by a straight line cutting it is 4/3 the area of a triangle inscribed in this segment.
For the proofs of these results, Archimedes used the method of exhaustion attributed to Eudoxus.

Medieval mathematics 
In medieval Europe, quadrature meant the calculation of area by any method. Most often the method of indivisibles was used; it was less rigorous than the geometric constructions of the Greeks, but it was simpler and more powerful. With its help, Galileo Galilei and Gilles de Roberval found the area of a cycloid arch, Grégoire de Saint-Vincent investigated the area under a hyperbola (Opus Geometricum, 1647), and Alphonse Antonio de Sarasa, de Saint-Vincent's pupil and commentator, noted the relation of this area to logarithms.

Integral calculus 
John Wallis algebrised this method; he wrote in his Arithmetica Infinitorum (1656) some series which are equivalent to what is now called the definite integral, and he calculated their values. Isaac Barrow and James Gregory made further progress: quadratures for some algebraic curves and spirals. Christiaan Huygens successfully performed a quadrature of the surface area of some solids of revolution.

The quadrature of the hyperbola by Saint-Vincent and de Sarasa provided a new function, the natural logarithm, of critical importance. With the invention of integral calculus came a universal method for area calculation. In response, the term quadrature has become traditional, and instead the modern phrase finding the area is more commonly used for what is technically the computation of a univariate definite integral.

See also 
 Gaussian quadrature
 Hyperbolic angle
 Numerical integration
 Quadratrix
 Tanh-sinh quadrature

Notes

References 
 Boyer, C. B. (1989) A History of Mathematics, 2nd ed. rev. by Uta C. Merzbach. New York: Wiley,  (1991 pbk ed. ).
 Eves, Howard (1990) An Introduction to the History of Mathematics, Saunders,
 Christiaan Huygens (1651) Theoremata de Quadratura Hyperboles, Ellipsis et Circuli
 Jean-Etienne Montucla (1873) History of the Quadrature of the Circle, J. Babin translator, William Alexander Myers editor, link from HathiTrust.
 Christoph Scriba (1983) "Gregory's Converging Double Sequence: a new look at the controversy between Huygens and Gregory over the 'analytical' quadrature of the circle", Historia Mathematica 10:274–85.

Integral calculus
History of mathematics
History of geometry
Mathematical terminology